The Chaldean Catholic Territory Dependent on (or Patriarchal Dependency of) the Patriarch of Jerusalem is a missionary pre-diocesan jurisdiction of the Chaldean Catholic Church sui iuris (Eastern Catholic: Chaldean Rite, Syriac language) covering the Holy land (Palestine and Israel).

As Territory Dependent on the Patriarch, it is immediately subject to the Chaldean Catholic Patriarch of Babylon (actually in Baghdad, Iraq), without being part of his or any other ecclesiastical province.
It is not entitled to a (Titular) Bishop as Ordinary, the incumbents use the style Protosyncellus (normally an official in an episcopal curia).

Patriarchal Vicars of Jerusalem 
Patriarchal Vicars/exarch of Jerusalem
 Msgr. Paul Collin (1990 – 1991), next Patriarchal Exarch of Jerusalem of the Chaldeans (1990 – ?)

See also 
 Catholic Church in Israel
 Chaldean Catholic Church

References 

Chaldean Catholic dioceses
Christian organizations established in 1997